The White Palace station is a station on the Doha Metro's Green Line in Hamad Medical City. It serves the Hamad Medical City and the Rumeilah districts. It is found on Ahmed Bin Ali Street in Hamad Medical City.

The station currently has no metrolinks. Facilities on the premises include restrooms and a prayer room.

History
The station was opened to the public on 10 December 2019 along with the other stations of the Green Line, which is also known as the Education Line.

Station Layout

Connections
It is served by bus routes 40, 41, 42, 43, 45, 49, 55, 56, 104, 104A, 104B, 156 and 156A.

References

Doha Metro stations
2019 establishments in Qatar
Railway stations opened in 2019